Bangsawan (Jawi: بڠساون) is a type of traditional Malay opera or theatre performed by a troupe, and accompanied by music and sometimes dances. The bangsawan theatrical performance encompasses music, dance and drama. It is widely spread in the Malay cultural realm in Malaysia, Indonesia, Singapore and Brunei. The artform is indigenous in Malay Peninsula, Riau Islands, Sumatra and coastal Borneo.

Etymology
In the Malay language, bangsawan means "nobleman". Bangsa means "nation", "race", from the Sanskrit word vamsa which means "family", "dynasty". The suffix -wan comes from the Sanskrit suffix -vant. A person is called bangsawan if he is descended from royal family (kings, princes, etc.). The theatre is called bangsawan because it is most often depicting the legends and stories of Malay nobles that took place in istana (Malay palaces and courts).

There was another category of noblemen in Indonesia, precisely in Java, called priyayi, who were not members of royal or princely families but formed a sort of nobles of the Robe, exerting administrative functions, including that of adipati (governor).

Theme
The bangsawan theatre usually centered on istana or Malay palace. The main theme of bangsawan theatre is usually based upon the adventure, romance and conquest of Malay sultans, kings, heroes, nobles, princes and princesses, that took place in various Malay courts in the archipelago. The fertile local Malay legends and epics such as the "Sulalatus Salatin" provides storylines and theme for the story to develop. The Malay King such as Seri Tri Buana and the popular Malay heroes such as the adventure of Hang Tuah of Malacca are the popular bangsawan themes. Another themes such as "Seulas Nangka" story about the history of Siak Sri Indrapura Sultanate.

Form
The bangsawan theatre is quite similar to western opera or drama, where the stories are presented through acting and singing, and certain characters are played during performance. The stories are drawn from diverse sources, such as local Malay, Indonesian, Indian, Arabic, Chinese and Western sources. Music, dance and costumes are used depending on the story being told. The performance is accompanied by music consists of gendang, rebana, drum and violin, playing Malay music and chanting dendang or Malay songs.

History
Bangsawan first developed in Penang, Malaysia, from the South Asian Parsi theatre performed by companies from the Bombay region; the first local troupe Pusi Indera Bangsawan of Penang was founded in 1885 and named after tycoon Mohamed Pusi who patroned the arts prior. The bangsawan theatre troupes reached their peak of popularity in the 19th to mid 20th century prior to the great war. In colonial Dutch East Indies the bangsawan theatre has inspired and influenced other form of theatrical performances, such as Komedie Stamboel and toneel. Prior to the development and the spread of radio and television entertainment in the region, travelling live theatres and drama such as bangsawan, was the main source of entertainment for local Malays in the villages and cities alike, and was held in high anticipation and excitement. In Lingga, Riau Islands, bangsawan show enjoyed its popularity among locals until around 1960s to 1970s. However, today in Indonesia, only a handful of bangsawan troupes survive. Nowadays, it is difficult, if not impossible to find any bangsawan troupes in Malaysia. A bangsawan troupe still operates in Singapore.

See also

Mak yong
Wayang

References

External links
 Bangsawan Seri Teri Buana on Youtube
 Bangsawan performance by Teater Mamanda in Panggung Seni Rakyat Riau 2013 on Youtube

Malay culture
Theatre in Indonesia
Traditional drama and theatre of Indonesia
Dances of Sumatra